Skryje is a municipality and village in Brno-Country District in the South Moravian Region of the Czech Republic. It has about 70 inhabitants.

Administrative parts
The hamlet of Boudy is an administrative part of Skryje.

References

Villages in Brno-Country District